El Reno Regional Airport  is in Canadian County, Oklahoma, United States, five miles southwest of El Reno, which owns it. The FAA's National Plan of Integrated Airport Systems for 2009–2013 categorized it as a general aviation facility.

Many U.S. airports use the same three-letter location identifier for the FAA and IATA, but this facility is RQO to the FAA and has no IATA code.

History
The airport opened in 1943 as a United States Army Air Forces World War II primary (stage 1) pilot training airfield by the Army Air Forces Training Command Gulf Coast Training Center  (later Central Flying Training Command).  It was known as El Reno Field or Mustang Field.

It was operated by the 320th Flying Training detachment, with the Midwest Air School as a contract flying training provider.  The Oklahoma Air College, Inc. also was a contractor to the USAAF at El Reno.  Fairchild PT-19s were the primary trainer. Also had several PT-17 Stearmans and a few P-40 Warhawks assigned.

During wartime, the airfield had three turf runways, their alignment now unknown. It had several (between 3 and 6) local auxiliary landing fields for emergency or overflow landings.  Known auxiliaries were at Calumet and Union City with several others in the El Reno area.

Pilot training at the airfield apparently  ended during the summer of 1944, with the reduced demand for new pilots.   The airfield was turned over to the local government at the end of the war.

TWISTEX storm chasers Tim Samaras, his son Paul and colleague Carl Young of South Lake Tahoe, California lost their lives in an EF3 multiple-vortex tornado near this area on May 31, 2013.

Facilities
The airport covers  an elevation of 1,420 feet (433 m). It has two runways: 17/35 is 5,600 by 75 feet (1,707 x 23 m) concrete and 18/36 is 4,630 by 190 feet (1,411 x 58 m) turf.

In the year ending February 12, 2008 the airport had 24,825 aircraft operations, average 68 per day: 99.9% general aviation and 0.1% military. 24 aircraft were then based at the airport: 79% single-engine and 21% multi-engine.

Mineral rights lease
This is required because the city acquired the facility years ago from the Federal Aviation Administration. The proceeds must be used for either improvements at El Reno airport or other aviation-related purposes. The winning bid was made by Haggard Land Company, which offered $15,000 per acre plus a 20 percent royalty for any oil or gas it extracts from the land. The reported value of the deal to the city was $4,800,000. Mayor Matt White said his goal was to pay off the airport debt, currently estimated at $600,000.

See also

 Oklahoma World War II Army Airfields
 31st Flying Training Wing (World War II)

References

External links 
 

1943 establishments in Oklahoma
Airports in Oklahoma
Airports established in 1943
Airfields of the United States Army Air Forces in Oklahoma
Buildings and structures in Canadian County, Oklahoma
USAAF Contract Flying School Airfields
USAAF Central Flying Training Command
American Theater of World War II